The 2022 Fundidores de Monterrey season is the Fundidores de Monterrey sixth season in the Liga de Fútbol Americano Profesional (LFA) and their third under head coach Carlos Strevel. After the 2021 season was cancelled due to the COVID-19 pandemic, the Fundidores returned to play in 2022.

Fundidores finished the regular season as the second ranked team with a 4–2 record. The Fundidores defeated the Raptors on the semifinal 30–27 with a touch down pass from Shelton Eppler to Tavarious Battiste on the last play of the game.

The Fundidores won the Tazón México V against the Gallos Negros de Querétaro 18–14, on 21 May, winning their first LFA championship.

Draft

Roster

Regular season

Standings

Schedule

Postseason

Schedule

Awards
The following Fundidores players were awarded at the 2022 LFA Gala.

Statistics

Offensive leaders

Defensive leaders

References

2022 in American football
Fundidores